The 2020 NTT IndyCar Series was the 25th season of the IndyCar Series and the 109th official championship season of American open wheel racing. The premier event was the 2020 Indianapolis 500. Josef Newgarden entered the season as the defending National Champion. Honda entered as defending Manufacturers' Cup champion for the second consecutive season. It was the first year under Penske management after they took over in late 2019.

Series news
On May 24, 2019, it was announced that the IndyCar Series would introduce cockpit protection, combining an Aeroscreen and the Halo used in Formula One, from the 2020 season onwards. The cockpit protection was built by Red Bull Advanced Technologies in a collaborative effort with Dallara. The combination of aeroscreen and halo is designed to improve safety standards by deflecting debris away from a driver's head and was originally developed for use in Formula One and IndyCar before its application was expanded to other open-wheel championships.
On November 3, 2019, it was announced the Team Penske owner Roger Penske had purchased IndyCar, LLC and the Indianapolis Motor Speedway. Penske also announced he will step down as full-time race strategist. On January 6, 2020, IndyCar announced the transactions were formally complete. Penske officially becomes just the fourth owner in Indianapolis Motor Speedway's history and marks the first time since 1945 where ownership of the Speedway has changed hands.

Confirmed entries
The following teams, entries, and drivers have been announced to compete in the 2020 NTT IndyCar Series season. All teams will use a spec Dallara DW12 chassis with UAK18 aero kit and Firestone tires.

Team changes
Formula One team McLaren Racing announced on August 1, 2019 it would join the series in 2020 in partnership with Arrow Schmidt Peterson Motorsports under the name Arrow McLaren Racing SP. The team will field two full-time entries. As a result of McLaren partnership, the team officially agreed to end its engine partner deal with Honda to allow Chevrolet to supply Schmidt Peterson Motorsports team as it was announced on August 9, 2019. On October 25, 2019, the joint venture unveiled a new logo and confirmed the team's name as Arrow McLaren SP.
On September 21, 2019 it was announced that Andretti Autosport would field a fifth entry for Colton Herta under the name Andretti Harding Steinbrenner Autosport, partnering with Mike Harding and George Michael Steinbrenner IV of the previously independent team Harding Steinbrenner Racing.
On November 8, 2019, Meyer Shank Racing, after competing part-time in 2017, 2018, and 2019, announced that they would expand to a full-time program in 2020 with Jack Harvey. The team retained its Honda power and entered a technical partnership with Andretti Technologies after 2 years partnering with Schmidt Peterson Motorsports.
On December 19, 2019, Dale Coyne Racing announced a partnership with 2004 24 Hours of Le Mans winners Team Goh to run Álex Palou for the full season.
On December 24, 2019, DragonSpeed released a schedule of six races for 2020, including the 104th Indianapolis 500. While 2019 driver Ben Hanley had previously been tipped to return, the December announcement did not confirm any drivers. On January 13, 2020, it was announced that Hanley would drive for DragonSpeed at the first round in St. Petersburg. On May 20, 2020, David Malsher-Lopez from Motorsport.com reported that DragonSpeed were revising their IndyCar schedule to start at the Indianapolis 500, with additional races depending on their concurrent European Le Mans Series and WeatherTech SportsCar Championship commitments.
On January 7, 2020, Dreyer & Reinbold Racing revealed to RACER that they would be expanding to a 4-race program in 2020. Team owner Dennis Reinbold revealed that Sage Karam would be back with the team in 2020, but did not specify how many rounds, or which rounds, Karam would be entering. On January 10, 2020, in an interview with IndyStar, Reinbold clarified that Karam would be driving their car in the rounds at St. Petersburg, Indianapolis, and Toronto.
On February 21, 2020, Citrone/Buhl Autosport, a partnership between Nick and Robert Citrone and Tom and Robbie Buhl, announced their intentions to partner with an existing team to enter the IndyCar Series at the GMR Grand Prix and attempt to qualify for the 2020 Indianapolis 500. On February 27, 2020, Rahal Letterman Lanigan Racing announced a partnership with Citrone/Buhl Autosport and Spencer Pigot will drive their entry in the GMR Grand Prix and the Indianapolis 500.
On June 2, 2020, Carlin announced that its No. 31 entry would not race at Texas due to funding issues.

Driver changes
On October 8, 2019 Chip Ganassi Racing announced that Marcus Ericsson would join the team, leaving Arrow Schmidt Peterson Motorsports to drive the revived No. 8 car in 2020.
On October 28, 2019 Arrow McLaren SP relieved James Hinchcliffe of his driving duties and signed 2019 Indy Lights champion Oliver Askew and former Carlin driver and 2018 Indy Lights champion Pato O'Ward to fill their two seats.
On November 15, 2019, Ed Carpenter Racing announced that Spencer Pigot would not be returning to the team in 2020. On November 20, ECR announced Rinus VeeKay had been signed to drive the No. 21 full-time.
On November 22, 2019, it was announced that Sébastien Bourdais would not return to Dale Coyne Racing with Vasser Sullivan due to a new need for funding. The same day, Bourdais confirmed his exit from the IndyCar Series after signing to drive for JDC-Miller Motorsports in the 2020 WeatherTech SportsCar Championship. On January 23, 2020, the team announced that Santino Ferrucci, who drove the No. 19 car for Dale Coyne Racing in 2019, would switch to the Vasser-Sullivan-supported No. 18 entry to replace Bourdais.
On December 9, 2019, Ed Carpenter Racing announced that Conor Daly would contest the road and street circuit races in the team's No. 20 entry with sponsorship from the United States Air Force, and would pilot a third entry for the team in the Indianapolis 500. He replaces Ed Jones, who will drive for Audi Sport Team WRT in the 2020 DTM season. Daly will also compete the five other oval events in Carlin's No. 59, replacing Max Chilton who quit racing ovals in 2019.
On January 22, 2020, A. J. Foyt Enterprises named Charlie Kimball the driver of their No. 4 entry, marking his return to full-time competition after running a partial schedule for Carlin in 2019.
 On January 29, 2020, Tony Kanaan announced that 2020 would be his final season as a primary driver in IndyCar. He will race in the six oval events in the No. 14 for A. J. Foyt Enterprises. On February 4, 2020 A. J. Foyt Enterprises confirmed that driving duties for the No. 14 on the road and street tracks would be split between Sébastien Bourdais and Dalton Kellett. Kellett will also drive the team's third entry in the Indianapolis 500.
 On February 5, 2020, Team Penske confirmed that defending Supercars champion Scott McLaughlin (a driver for the Supercars team Penske co-owned at the time) would make his IndyCar debut at the GMR Grand Prix on the Indianapolis road course. Hélio Castroneves, who drove a fourth Penske car at both Indianapolis races in 2018 and 2019, will only race in the 2020 Indianapolis 500 for Penske. On March 27, 2020, it was revealed that McLaughlin would no longer be making his IndyCar debut at the GMR Grand Prix due to the rescheduling of the race. On September 17, it was confirmed that McLaughlin would make his debut in the final race of the season in St. Petersburg.
On February 19, 2020, Andretti Autosport announced that James Hinchcliffe would race in three events in the team's No. 29 entry with sponsorship from Genesys. He will be driving at the GMR Grand Prix, the Indianapolis 500 and the Genesys 600.
On February 25, 2020, Fernando Alonso, who attempted to qualify for the Indianapolis 500 with McLaren Racing in 2019, announced that he would be driving for Arrow McLaren SP at the 2020 Indianapolis 500.
On March 10, 2020, Carlin announced that Felipe Nasr, who races full-time with Action Express Racing in the 2020 WeatherTech SportsCar Championship, would make his IndyCar debut in St. Petersburg.
On September 23, 2020, Andretti Autosport announced that Zach Veach would leave the team ahead of the Harvest Grand Prix. On September 25, the team announced that James Hinchcliffe would take over the No. 26 entry for the remainder of the season.
On September 24, 2020, Arrow McLaren SP announced that Oliver Askew has not been medically cleared to drive the Harvest Grand Prix after Askew reported balance and coordination issues after the round at Mid-Ohio. The team subsequently announced that Hélio Castroneves would fill in for Askew at the Harvest Grand Prix.

Schedule 
The 17-race 2020 schedule was initially announced on September 1, 2019; there was one change from the 2019 IndyCar Series calendar with Pocono Raceway being replaced by Richmond Raceway, the latter track returning to the series for the first time since 2009. As a result of the COVID-19 pandemic, ten races were cancelled (including the Detroit doubleheader), five rescheduled, and five replacement races added.

During the delay to start the season, many of the IndyCar series drivers participated in the INDYCAR iRacing Challenge.

Schedule changes due to the COVID-19 pandemic
The onset of the COVID-19 pandemic in North America, and subsequent restrictions on public gatherings and non-essential business (which have affected all sports worldwide), led to the postponement of the IndyCar Series season to at least June, and the cancellation of several races.

On March 12, 2020, IndyCar announced that the opening Grand Prix of St. Petersburg would be held with no spectators and essential personnel only. However, the next day (March 13), IndyCar announced that the event, as well as all races through April, would be cancelled, citing widening closures and health risks of gatherings. The series announced an intent to begin with the two "Month of May" races in Indianapolis which would have been the first time since the 1957 season that IMS would begin the season.

That did not occur however, because on March 26, IndyCar announced that it would postpone the GMR Grand Prix and Indianapolis 500 to July 4 and August 23 respectively (with the former joining NASCAR's Brickyard 400 race weekend), marking the first time either event would be held outside of May. The Detroit Grand Prix was to serve as season opener, while plans were announced for the St. Petersburg race to possibly be reinstated.

On April 6, IndyCar announced the cancellation of the Detroit Grand Prix, with organizers citing Michigan's stay-at-home order and other scheduled events at Belle Isle making it impossible to prepare for or reschedule the event. To compensate for other cancelled races, IndyCar also announced the conversion of the Iowa 300 and Monterey Grand Prix races to double-header weekends, and added a third Indianapolis Motor Speedway race on October 3 as part of the USAC-sanctioned Intercontinental GT Challenge endurance race meeting on the road course.

On May 7, it was announced that the season would commence with a condensed, one-day event format at Texas Motor Speedway, with no spectators in attendance. As well as this, extensive social distancing protocols related to the COVID-19 pandemic were announced for team personnel, as well as provisions for the use of personal protective equipment (PPE). On May 27, it was announced that tire stints during the Genesys 300 would be limited to a maximum of 35 laps, as unused tires from the 2019 DXC Technology 600 were utilized for the race weekend. This had occurred previously, during the final third of the 2017 Rainguard Water Sealers 600, where a 30-lap maximum was implemented with competition cautions.

On May 13, IndyCar announced that the Firestone Grand Prix of St. Petersburg would be held as the season finale on October 25, being the only street course race on the schedule.

On May 15, the promoters of the Honda Indy Toronto announced that the race scheduled for July 12 would be postponed.

On May 21, IndyCar announced further changes to the schedule. The round at Road America was moved to July and became a doubleheader weekend, the previously postponed Toronto race was cancelled, and the Richmond round was cancelled.

On June 4, IMS announced that all events during the Brickyard 400 weekend, including the GMR Grand Prix, would be held with no spectators.

On July 15, IndyCar announced a new qualifying format for the Iowa IndyCar 250s where the first lap would set the drivers starting spot for race 1 and the second lap would set the drivers starting spot for race 2.

On July 22, it was announced that the Indianapolis 500 would be further capped at 25% capacity.

On July 27, the round at Portland and double-header rounds at Laguna Seca were canceled. To fill the gaps in the schedule, the rounds at Mid-Ohio, Gateway, and the Harvest GP at the Indianapolis road course were converted into double-header rounds. The double-header road course qualifying format was announced to be utilized once more at Mid-Ohio and Indianapolis, while the double-header oval qualifying format used at Iowa would also be used at Gateway.

On August 1, IndyCar officials, Mid-Ohio track officials, and the promoter of the race at Mid-Ohio announced that the doubleheader at Mid-Ohio would be postponed to later in the season due to an uptick in COVID-19 cases in Ohio. On September 5, the series announced the race would go ahead as a doubleheader event on September 12–13.

On August 4, citing increases in COVID-19 cases in Marion County, Indiana, it was announced that the Indianapolis 500 would be closed to the public.

Cancelled events

Results

Points standings

 Ties are broken by number of wins, followed by number of 2nds, 3rds, etc.; then by finishing position in the previous race; then by random draw.

Driver standings 
 At all races except the Indy 500, the pole position qualifier earned 1 point. The top nine Indy 500 qualifiers received points, descending from 9 points for the pole position. At double header races, the fastest qualifier of each qualifying group earned 1 point.
 Drivers who lead at least one race lap were awarded 1 point. The driver who leads the most laps during a race scored an additional 2 points.
 Entrant-initiated engine change-outs before the engine reaches their required distance run resulted in the loss of 10 points.
 The usual double points for the season finale were suspended for this season.

Entrant standings 

 Based on the entrant, used for oval qualifications order, and starting grids when qualifying is cancelled.
 Only full-time entrants, and at-large part-time entrants shown.

Manufacturer standings 
 All manufacturer points (including qualifying points, race finish points, and race win bonus points) can only be earned by full-season entrants, and provided they are using an engine from their initial allocation, or have mileaged out all previously used engines. Ineligible cars are removed from the finishing order used for race finish points, and cannot score pole or win bonus points.
 The top two finishing entrants from each manufacturer in each race score points for their respective manufacturer. The manufacturer that wins each race will be awarded five additional points.
 At all races except the Indy 500, the manufacturer who qualifies on pole earns one point. At the Indy 500, the fastest Saturday qualifier earns one point, while the pole position winner on Sunday earns two points.

See also
2020 Indy Lights (cancelled)
2020 Indy Pro 2000 Championship
2020 U.S. F2000 National Championship

Footnotes

References

External links
 

 
IndyCar Series
IndyCar Series
IndyCar Series seasons